2145 Blaauw, provisional designation , is a dark Ursula asteroid from the outer regions of the asteroid belt, approximately 38 kilometers in diameter. It was discovered on 24 October 1976, by astronomer Richard Martin West at the La Silla Observatory in northern Chile. The asteroid was named after Dutch astronomer Adriaan Blaauw.

Orbit and classification 

Blaauw is a member of the Ursula family, a large family of C- and X-type asteroids, named after its parent body, 375 Ursula. It orbits the Sun in the outer asteroid belt at a distance of 2.9–3.5 AU once every 5 years and 9 months (2,107 days; semi-major axis of 3.22 AU). Its orbit has an eccentricity of 0.10 and an inclination of 15° with respect to the ecliptic.

Physical characteristics 

Blaauw is an assumed, carbonaceous C-type asteroid.

Rotation period 

Photometric measurements made from the Oakley Southern Sky Observatory during 2012 gave a lightcurve with a period of 12.141 ± 0.003 hours and a variation in brightness of 0.18 ± 0.03 in magnitude.

Diameter and albedo 

According to the surveys carried out by the Japanese Akari satellite and the NEOWISE mission of NASA's Wide-field Infrared Survey Explorer, Blaauw measures between 37.11 and 40.55 kilometers in diameter and its surface has an albedo between 0.051 and 0.076.

The Collaborative Asteroid Lightcurve Link derives an albedo of 0.0665 and a diameter of 34.06 kilometers based on an absolute magnitude of 10.9.

Naming 

This minor planet was named after Dutch astronomer Adriaan Blaauw (1914–2010), who was director of the European Southern Observatory (1970–74), president of the International Astronomical Union (1976–79) and professor at the Leiden Observatory (1975–1981). His study included the structure of the Milky Way and stellar kinematics and associations. The official  was published by the Minor Planet Center on 1 July 1979.

References

External links 
 Asteroid Lightcurve Database (LCDB), query form (info )
 Dictionary of Minor Planet Names, Google books
 Asteroids and comets rotation curves, CdR – Observatoire de Genève, Raoul Behrend
 Discovery Circumstances: Numbered Minor Planets (1)-(5000) – Minor Planet Center
 
 

002145
Discoveries by Richard Martin West
Named minor planets
19761024